The Worcester County Horticultural Society is a non-profit American horticultural society based in Boylston, Massachusetts, USA, whose stated mission in 2014 was to "inspire the use and appreciation of horticulture to improve lives, enrich communities and strengthen commitment to the natural world", building upon its founding mission to "advanc[e] the science and encourag[e] and improv[e] the practice of [h]orticulture". Formally established in 1842, it describes itself as the third-oldest horticultural society in the United States after the Pennsylvania Horticultural Society and the Massachusetts Horticultural Society. Today, the society's work predominantly focuses in organizing and operating Tower Hill Botanic Garden, as well as supporting the Cary Award, an award program for excellence in New England cultivation practices.

History

The society was informally founded on September 19, 1840, when several local doctors and businessmen met in Worcester "for the purposes of mutual improvement in the theoretical and practical branches of Horticulture" and, in the subsequent weeks, organized an exhibition of fine specimens of orchard and garden plants from cultivators in Central Massachusetts. The organization's founders shaped it in homage to the Royal Horticultural Society in London, expressing hope in their earliest reports that their "little Society, which has thus far so bravely followed in the footsteps of the great Association of London, may, like our other institutions, continue to flourish". The society was formally established by an act of the Massachusetts General Court on March 3, 1842. The group continued to host exhibitions annually and, by 1850, had a large enough membership and funds to purchase a plot of land and to construct its first formal headquarters, "Horticultural Hall", on Front Street in Worcester. Continuing to expand throughout the 19th century and the early 20th century, the society built another, larger, facility with library and auditorium space in 1928. This building is now home to the Worcester Historical Museum.

In 1983, the board of trustees made a motion to found a botanical garden in Worcester County and, by the end of 1985, this was filled with the purchase of the Tower Hill Farm which is the society's main project and headquarters today. Though the society moved from its Worcester headquarters in 1986, it remains active in the community, having spearheaded efforts in the Worcester Tree Initiative by providing more than 30,000 trees to replace those lost in efforts to eradicate the Asian long-horned beetle.

Governance 
Operations of the Worcester County Horticultural Society are overseen by a board of trustees. Trustees meet at regular intervals throughout the year, as well as on committees that support the staff of Tower Hill Botanic Garden. Daily operations of the garden are led by a CEO, directors and staff managers.

References

External links
 Tower Hill Botanic Garden official website
 The Cary Award
 Transactions of the Worcester County Horticultural Society'complete collection of 1847—2006 annual reports

Horticultural organizations based in the United States
Culture of Worcester, Massachusetts
Gardens in Massachusetts
Non-profit organizations based in Massachusetts
1842 establishments in Massachusetts
Organizations established in 1842